According to the Intelligence and Security Committee Russia report, released on 21 July 2020, there is substantial evidence that Russian interference in the British economy and politics is commonplace; namely Russian interference in the 2016 Brexit referendum, and further to this, evidence was uncovered detailing alleged disinformation following the 2014 Scottish independence referendum. The report described the UK as one of Russia's "top targets" as it was "seen as central to the Western anti-Russian lobby".

According to the report, British governments have "welcomed the [Russian] oligarchs and their money with open arms, providing them with a means of recycling illicit finance through the London 'laundromat', and connections at the highest levels with access to U.K. companies and political figures". The committee was not authorised by the UK government to investigate whether Russian interference had affected the Brexit referendum, since any such investigation was not within the purview of UK intelligence services because any such actions by the security services themselves could be seen as interference, itself undermining democracy.

References

See also 
 Russian interference in the 2016 Brexit referendum
Russian Laundromat

Russian interference in British politics
Foreign electoral intervention
Russia–United Kingdom relations